Helen Freeman (born 23 November 1989) is a 4.0 point British wheelchair basketball player who represented Great Britain in five European championships, and at the 2008 Summer Paralympics in Beijing, the 2012 Summer Paralympics in London and the 2016 Summer Paralympics in Rio de Janeiro.

Biography
Helen Freeman was born in Watford on 23 November 1989. A 4.0 point player, she began playing wheelchair basketball  with Aspire Force when she was 12. She played with the national team at the European Championships in Wetzlar, Germany, in 2007, winning bronze. At age 18, she was the youngest player on the side at the 2008 Summer Paralympics in Beijing. She went on to win bronze medals at the European Championships in 2009, 2011, 2013 and 2015.

She played with the British team that finished sixth at the 2010 Wheelchair Basketball World Championship in  Birmingham. This was the team's best ever finish, but at the 2014 Women's World Wheelchair Basketball Championship in Toronto, Canada, they improved to finish fifth. In addition to being the tournament's third highest scorer, she was second in assists per game and sixth in rebounds.

Freeman attended the University of Illinois, where she played on the wheelchair basketball team. She was an Athletic All-American in each of the five years she was there, and an Academic All-American in three of those years. In May 2014 she graduated with a degree in kinesiology, and in August 2015 with a Master of Science degree in Business Administration. In May 2016, she was named as part of the team for the 2016 Summer Paralympics in Rio de Janeiro. The team produced Britain's best ever performance, making it all the way to the semi-finals, but lost to the semi-final to the United States, and then the bronze medal match to the Netherlands.

Achievements
 2007: Bronze at the European Championships (Wetzlar, Germany) 
 2009: Bronze at the European Championships (Stoke Mandeville, United Kingdom) 
 2011: Bronze at the European Championships (Nazareth, Israel) 
 2011: Bronze at the 2011 Women's U25 Wheelchair Basketball World Championship (St Catharines, Canada) 
 2013: Bronze at the European Championships (Frankfurt, Germany) 
 2015: Bronze at the European Championships (Worcester, England) 
 2017: Bronze at the European Championships (Tenerife, Spain)
 2018: Silver at the  2018 Wheelchair Basketball World Championship (Hamburg, Germany)

References

External links
 
 
 

Wheelchair basketball players at the 2008 Summer Paralympics
Wheelchair basketball players at the 2012 Summer Paralympics
Wheelchair basketball players at the 2016 Summer Paralympics
1989 births
Living people
Paralympic wheelchair basketball players of Great Britain
Sportspeople from Watford
University of Illinois College of Applied Health Sciences alumni
Gies College of Business alumni
Wheelchair basketball players at the 2020 Summer Paralympics